Kevin Michael Loughery (born March 28, 1940) is an American former professional basketball player and coach.

Career biography

Loughery spent 11 seasons in the National Basketball Association (1962–1973), almost nine of them with the Baltimore Bullets. He was traded along with Fred Carter from the Bullets to the Philadelphia 76ers for Archie Clark, a 1973 second-round selection (19th overall–Louie Nelson) and cash on October 17, 1971. His head coaching career began when he replaced Roy Rubin as player-coach of a 76ers team that was 4–47 on January 23, 1973. He received a player-coach contract which included an offer to continue in that capacity for two more years beyond the balance of that season. The team slightly improved under Loughery, posting a 5–26 record for the remainder of the season. He declined the offer to stay with the 76ers and was eventually replaced by Gene Shue on June 15, 1973.

Instead in the meantime, he effectively retired as an active player when he accepted a five‐year contract as head coach of the New York Nets of the American Basketball Association (ABA) on April 26, 1973, succeeding Lou Carnesecca who had elected to return to St. John's University in a similar capacity. With superstar Julius Erving, Loughery won two ABA championships in three seasons.  After the ABA disbanded and the Nets joined the NBA, Loughery continued to coach the Nets for their first five seasons in the league.  The team would struggle in their first couple of seasons without Erving, whose contract was sold to the Philadelphia 76ers due to financial struggles.  The team would also move to New Jersey and become the New Jersey Nets. He was fired midway through the 1980–81 season and replaced by Bob MacKinnon.

Loughery was hired by the Atlanta Hawks the very next season and he guided them to two straight playoff appearances, including one with rookie Dominique Wilkins.  He was fired once again after the 1982–83 season and replaced by Mike Fratello.

The next two seasons, Loughery coached the Chicago Bulls.  In his second season with rookie Michael Jordan, the Bulls made the playoffs. In the book The Jordan Rules Michael was quoted as saying that Loughery was the most fun coach he ever played for and that Loughery allowed him to free-lance and play the style he wanted.

Loughery was a longtime on-and-off broadcaster for CBS Sports' coverage of the NBA throughout the '80s, calling regular season and late playoff games.

Loughery went to the Washington Bullets the next season as an assistant to Gene Shue.  When Shue was fired with 13 games left in the 1985–86 season, Loughery guided the team to the playoffs and once again the next season. He was dismissed and replaced by Wes Unseld on January 3, 1988 as a result of the Bullets' 8–19 start. 

After working in broadcasting once again, doing part time work for TBS and TNT, Loughery was hired by the Miami Heat as their second coach three years after they joined the league as an expansion team.  Loughery guided the Heat to their first ever playoff appearance and again in 1993–94.

After his stint with the Heat, Loughery went back into broadcasting, first working with CNN/SI until 2002 when they folded. Loughery, who at times contributed as a guest for ESPN Radio, then joined ESPN Radio's broadcast of the 2002 NBA Finals as a guest, later being hired full-time by ESPN for their radio broadcasts of the NBA starting with the 2002-03 season.

Coaching record

NBA

|-
| align="left" |PHI
| align="left" |
|31||5||26||.161|| align="center" |4th in Atlantic||—||—||—||—
| align="center" |Missed Playoffs
|-
| align="left" |NYN
| align="left" |
|82||22||60||.268|| align="center" |5th in Atlantic||—||—||—||—
| align="center" |Missed Playoffs
|-
| align="left" |NJN
| align="left" |
|82||24||58||.293|| align="center" |5th in Atlantic||—||—||—||—
| align="center" |Missed Playoffs
|-
| align="left" |NJN
| align="left" |
|82||37||45||.451|| align="center" |3rd in Atlantic||2||0||2||.000
| align="center" |Lost in First Round
|-
| align="left" |NJN
| align="left" |
|82||34||48||.415|| align="center" |5th in Atlantic||—||—||—||—
| align="center" |Missed Playoffs
|-
| align="left" |NJN
| align="left" |
|35||12||23||.343|| align="center" |(fired)||—||—||—||—
| align="center" |—
|-
| align="left" |ATL
| align="left" |
|82||42||40||.512|| align="center" |2nd in Central||2||0||2||.000
| align="center" |Lost in First Round
|-
| align="left" |ATL
| align="left" |
|82||43||39||.524|| align="center" |2nd in Central||3||1||2||.333
| align="center" |Lost in First Round
|-
| align="left" |CHI
| align="left" |
|82||27||55||.329|| align="center" |5th in Central||—||—||—||—
| align="center" |Missed Playoffs
|-
| align="left" |CHI
| align="left" |
|82||38||44||.463|| align="center" |3rd in Central||4||1||3||.250
| align="center" |Lost in First Round
|-
| align="left" |WSH
| align="left" |
|13||7||6||.538|| align="center" |3rd in Atlantic||5||2||3||.400
| align="center" |Lost in First Round
|-
| align="left" |WSH
| align="left" |
|82||42||40||.512|| align="center" |3rd in Atlantic||3||0||3||.000
| align="center" |Lost in First Round
|-
| align="left" |WSH
| align="left" |
|27||8||19||.296|| align="center" |(fired)||—||—||—||—
| align="center" |—
|-
| align="left" |MIA
| align="left" |
|82||38||44||.463|| align="center" |4th in Atlantic||3||0||3||.000
| align="center" |Lost in First Round
|-
| align="left" |MIA
| align="left" |
|82||36||46||.439|| align="center" |5th in Atlantic||—||—||—||—
| align="center" |Missed Playoffs
|-
| align="left" |MIA
| align="left" |
|82||42||40||.512|| align="center" |4th in Atlantic||5||2||3||.400
| align="center" |Lost in First Round
|-
| align="left" |MIA
| align="left" |
|46||17||29||.370|| align="center" |(fired)||—||—||—||—
| align="center" |—
|-class="sortbottom"
| align="left" |Career
| ||1136||474||662||.417|| ||27||6||21||.222

References

External links
 BasketballReference.com: Kevin Loughery

1940 births
Living people
American men's basketball coaches
American men's basketball players
Atlanta Hawks assistant coaches
Atlanta Hawks head coaches
Baltimore Bullets (1963–1973) players
Basketball coaches from New York (state)
Basketball players from New York City
Boston College Eagles men's basketball players
Chicago Bulls head coaches
Detroit Pistons draft picks
Detroit Pistons players
Los Angeles Clippers announcers
Miami Heat head coaches
New Jersey Nets head coaches
New York Knicks draft picks
New York Nets head coaches
Philadelphia 76ers head coaches
Philadelphia 76ers players
Player-coaches
Point guards
Shooting guards
Sportspeople from Brooklyn
St. John's Red Storm men's basketball players
Washington Bullets head coaches
Cardinal Hayes High School alumni